The Second Battle of Kalaa of the Beni Abbes took place in October 1559. It opposed the regency of Algiers and its ally of circumstance the Kingdom of Kuku to the Kingdom of Ait Abbas.

Hassan Pasha ordered an expedition against the capital of the kingdom, the Kalâa of Ait Abbas, to take revenge on the expedition of Sultan Abdelaziz of Kalaa, which had destroyed the forts of Medjana and Bordj Bou Arreridj, in order to annihilate his influence. On the second day of the fighting, Sultan Abdelaziz was killed. His brother Sultan Ahmed Amokrane succeeded him, and his soldiers maintained their position.
After eight days, Hassan Pasha, seeing that his position had not evolved, and his army was experiencing losses every day, as well as difficulties related to the terrain, had to retreat. Nevertheless, the Turks returned to Algiers with the head of the sultan Abdelaziz as a trophy

See also

First Battle of Kalaa of the Beni Abbes
Kalâa of Ait Abbas
Regency of Algiers
Kingdom of Ait Abbas
Kingdom of Tlemcen

References

Kalaa of the Beni Abbes
Kalaa of the Beni Abbes
Kalaa of the Beni Abbes
Kalaa of the Beni Abbes
Kalaa of the Beni Abbes